José Alexander Pabón de la Cruz (born August 8, 1991) is an Ecuadorian footballer who plays as a defender for Técnico Universitario.He is the nephew of the historic Ecuadorian footballer Ulises de la Cruz .

Honors
LDU Quito
Serie A: 2010

References

External links
FEF card 

1991 births
Living people
Footballers from Quito
Association football defenders
Ecuadorian footballers
L.D.U. Quito footballers
C.D. El Nacional footballers
Mushuc Runa S.C. footballers
C.D. Técnico Universitario footballers